Easton House, also known as the Bachmann Publick House and George Taylor's Easton Property, is a historic inn and tavern located at Easton in Northampton County, Pennsylvania.  It was built in 1753, and is a 2 3/4 story rubble limestone building, with squared corners, in the Georgian style.  

Easton House was expanded by George Taylor (c. 1716–1781) in 1765, who used it as a residence and tavern. A red clay brick addition was built in 1828.  The building was the site of a number of important judicial proceedings when it housed the Magistrates Court in the early 19th century.

It was added to the National Register of Historic Places in 1980.

References

External links
 Bachmann Publick House - The Delaware & Lehigh National Heritage Corridor

Commercial buildings on the National Register of Historic Places in Pennsylvania
Georgian architecture in Pennsylvania
Commercial buildings completed in 1754
Commercial buildings completed in 1828
Buildings and structures in Northampton County, Pennsylvania
Museums in Northampton County, Pennsylvania
History museums in Pennsylvania
1754 establishments in Pennsylvania
National Register of Historic Places in Northampton County, Pennsylvania
Individually listed contributing properties to historic districts on the National Register in Pennsylvania